Hohenkirchen is a village and a former municipality in the district of Gotha, in Thuringia, Germany. Since December 2019, it is part of the municipality Georgenthal.

People 
 Georg Böhm (1661-1733), composer and organist

References

Former municipalities in Thuringia
Gotha (district)
Saxe-Coburg and Gotha